Dolichoderus kutschlinicus is an extinct species of ant in the genus Dolichoderus. Described by Deichmüller in 1881, the fossils of a queen were discovered in what used to be Czechoslovakia.

References

†
Prehistoric life of Europe
Fossil taxa described in 1881
Hymenoptera of Europe
Fossil ant taxa